David Schlessinger (born September 20, 1936, in Toronto, Canada) is a Canadian-born American biochemist, microbiologist, and geneticist. He is known for his directorship of the development of the map of the X chromosome.

Biography
His family moved from Toronto to Chicago in 1939. David Schlessinger graduated from Theodore Roosevelt High School in 1953. At the age of 16 he matriculated at the University of Chicago. In 1955 he worked as a paid student-technician in Eugene Goldwasser's laboratory. Schlessinger graduated from the University of Chicago in 1957 with a B.S. in chemistry. At Harvard University he graduated in 1960 with a Ph.D. in biochemistry. According to Schlessinger, his most important achievement "as a graduate student was to develop the first in vitro system that could actually make some little bits of protein" — this system enabled Arthur Kornberg and other researchers to determine the molecular mechanisms of the genetic code. As a graduate student he spent some time at Caltech, where he worked on an experiment that failed. However, at Caltech he did meet a woman who was a plant physiologist and became his wife in 1960. Schlessinger's Ph.D. thesis "Ribosomes from Escheria coli" was supervised by James D. Watson.

As a postdoc, Schlessinger worked at the Pasteur Institute, where he was supervised by Jacques Monod. In August 1962, Schlessinger with his wife and infant daughter, arrived in St. Louis, where he was to spend 35 years as a professor at Washington University in St. Louis. There he was the director of the Human Genome Center from 1987 to 1997. In 1995 he was the president of the American Society for Microbiology (ASM). After his many years in St. Louis as a professor of Molecular Microbiology, Genetics, and Microbiology in Medicine, Schlessinger moved to the National Institute on Aging (NIA) in September 1997. He has done research on microbial genomes, as well as the human genome. At NIA he headed the Laboratory of Genetics from 1997 to 2017. He was instrumental in starting the NIA's SardiNIA Project in 2001 and in retirement continued as an advisor to the project. The purpose of NIA's SardiNIA Project is the identification of "genetic bases for prominent age-associatred changes".

In 1969 he received the Eli Lilly and Company-Elanco Research Award.

Schlessinger and his wife have two daughters and six grandchildren.

Selected publications

References

Presidents of the American Society for Microbiology
1936 births
Living people
American biochemists
American microbiologists
American geneticists
University of Chicago alumni
Harvard University alumni
Washington University in St. Louis faculty
National Institutes of Health people